Conasprella coriolisi is a species of sea snail, a marine gastropod mollusk in the family Conidae, the cone snails and their allies.

Like all species within the genus Conasprella, these snails are predatory and venomous. They are capable of "stinging" humans, therefore live ones should be handled carefully or not at all.

Description
The size of the shell varies between 40 mm and 53 mm.

Distribution
This marine species occurs off New Caledonia, Vanuatu and in the Coral Sea at depths between 150 m and 550 m.

References

 Röckel, D., Richard, G. & Moolenbeek, R.G. 1995. Deep-water Cones (Gastropoda: Conidae) from the New Caledonia region. In, Bouchet, P. (ed.). Résultats des Campagnes MUSORSTOM, Vol. 14. Mémoires de Muséum National d'Histoire Naturelle 167: 557-594
 Röckel, D., Korn, W. & Kohn, A.J. 1995. Manual of the Living Conidae. Volume 1: Indo-Pacific Region. Wiesbaden : Hemmen 517 pp
 Puillandre N., Duda T.F., Meyer C., Olivera B.M. & Bouchet P. (2015). One, four or 100 genera? A new classification of the cone snails. Journal of Molluscan Studies. 81: 1-23

External links
 To World Register of Marine Species
 Specimen at MNHN, Paris

coriolisi
Gastropods described in 1995